Wendy Wu: Homecoming Warrior is a 2006 Disney Channel Original Movie (DCOM) starring Brenda Song and Shin Koyamada. The voice of Hadley Hudson is also featured. Koyamada plays a Chinese monk who visits the title character. Wendy is an American teenager played by Song, claimed to be the reincarnation of a powerful female warrior. She is also the only person who can prevent a spirit of an ancient and evil Chinese dragon named Yan-Lo, voiced by Hudson, from destroying the world.

This film had more than 5.7 million viewers on the night of its premiere making Wendy Wu: Homecoming Warrior the fifth highest viewed DCOM at the time. It also received the highest rating in the history of Disney Channel Japan. The film also broke records in the United Kingdom and Europe, making Disney Channel the highest rated kids’ channel in Europe.

The film was shot almost entirely in Auckland, New Zealand. Wendy Wu: Homecoming Warrior was the second DCOM to be added on the iTunes Store. Disney released several products to promote the film. A sequel was scheduled to begin filming in early 2008,<ref name="ShinWWHW2">[http://www.movieweb.com/news/NEKV7NPLKvOwPK "Shin Koyamada Joins the Cast of Wendy Wu: Homecoming Warrior 2]. Variety. Retrieved on Sunday, October 14, 2007.</ref> but was eventually cancelled.

 Plot 
Wendy Wu is a popular Asian-American teenager whose life is turned upside down by a visit from Shen, a young Buddhist monk. He claims that Wendy is the reincarnation of a mighty female warrior and the only one who can prevent an evil spirit from destroying the world. Shen begs Wendy to wear a powerful amulet, which will protect her from evil until he can fully train her in martial arts.

Wendy is too busy campaigning for Homecoming Queen against Jessica Dawson, her school rival, to be concerned about saving the world. Wendy's traditional grandmother knows that Shen is speaking the truth; her own mother (Wendy's great-grandmother) was the previous Yin Warrior who defeated Yan-Lo in China ninety years earlier. However, the other members of Wendy's family have lost touch with their Chinese heritage. Shen's discussion of Chinese culture inspires Wendy's mother, a researcher at Fair Springs National History Museum. Shen's mooncakes do the same for Wendy's father. However, faced with the choice between fighting evil and going shopping, Wendy chooses to go to the mall with her best friends Tory and Lisa.

Yan-Lo soon materializes and sets out to destroy Wendy before she can attain her full Yin Warrior powers. In quick succession, Yan-Lo possesses a security guard at the museum, Wendy's brother, her dog, her principal, her teachers, her best friend Tory, and even Jessica Dawson. Wendy breaks up with her boyfriend Austin after noticing how toxic and self-absorbed he is. She then starts to bond more with Shen. With Shen's help, Wendy's teachers are possessed by the souls of the Five Animals of Chinese martial arts to help teach Wendy. Mr. Medina becomes the Tiger; coach Gibbs becomes the Snake; Mr. Tobias becomes the Crane; Mr. Garibay becomes the Leopard; and Shen himself becomes the Dragon.

Wendy completes her training and learns that she has become Homecoming Queen. She then discovers that her battle takes place the same night of the Homecoming Dance. Feeling betrayed, she opts out of the battle. On the night of Homecoming her grandmother insists that Wendy fulfill her destiny, but Wendy refuses. She finally changes her mind upon learning from the monks that Shen has gone to the battle alone. Wendy and the monks arrive to save Shen just in time. Wendy's martial arts training unleashes her inner heroine for a final fight with Yan-Lo. In the last scene, Jessica thanks Wendy for lending her the Homecoming crown and Queen status, and the conflict between the two is put to rest. The heroes are about to leave when Yan-Lo returns in his true form, and the battle continues. Shen attempts to sacrifice himself, as it is his destiny, but Wendy saves him by changing his destiny. Wendy and Shen attack Yan-Lo together, destroying him forever. The monks tell Shen this is his last life, and they ascend. In the end, Wendy and Shen leave to get cappuccinos and chocolate, which Shen said he loved earlier in the movie. This implies that the two might be dating.

Cast

 Release 
The premiere of Wendy Wu: Homecoming Warrior aired at 8 p.m. Eastern Time on June 16, 2006, including a telecast hosted by Brenda Song and the movie's cast. The movie premiered on Toon Disney on May 12, 2008. The film aired on ABC Family on June 20, 2006, as part of its Jetix block, making the film the only Disney Channel Original Movie to be aired on that channel.

On Saturday, August 18, Disney Channel aired "Wendy Wu: Homecoming Chat". The stars of the movie answered questions posed by fans.

Advertising used the taglines "She's pretty...she's pretty tough"; "Part Teenager. Part Warrior. All Hero."; and "Homecoming Warrior: Queen."

Disney Channel On Demand debuted the movie in January 2007.

The "Kick'in" version of the film first aired on February 19, 2007, in United States and on April 14, 2008, in Canada. The cast had a chat session and a did you know session. This version also included 5 never-before-seen scenes and extended endings.

The "Remixed" version aired on September 8, 2007. The entire cast answered questions and taught the viewers easy kung-fu moves.

The "Pop-Up" version of the film aired on November 23, 2007. Random movie trivia appeared throughout the film in boxes at the bottom of the screen.

The "What's What" version of the film aired on March 7, 2008, at Disney Channel Asia,l. Random movie trivia appeared throughout the film in boxes at the bottom of the screen, much like the Pop-Up version.

The movie premiered in May 2009 on Disney Channel Latin America.

 Ratings Wendy Wu had more than 5.7 million viewers on the night of its premiere, making it the fifth highest viewed DCOM at the time. The film was originally set to air on June 2, 2006, but was pushed back by Disney Channel due to technical difficulties involving film's official website. The film exceeded its competition on basic cable channels, ranking  No. 1 with children 6-11 (2.1 million/9.5 rating) and adolescents 9-14 (2.1 million/8.6 rating) at the time. The movie also gained 1.2 million viewers start-to-finish, with 6.0 million Total Viewers watching the movie's final quarter-hour (4.8 million to 6.0 million).Wendy Wu exceeded year-ago time period numbers, delivering triple-digit gains in total viewers (178%, 5,649,000 vs. 2,050,000), Kids 6-11 (132%, 8.8/2,129,000 vs. 3.8/933,000) and Tweens 9-14 (187%, 8.6/2,120,000 vs. 3.0/731,000).

 Reception 
UltimateDisney.com said that the movie relies on stereotypes, but also that Song shone as the title character. The San Francisco Asian American Film Festival considered the character a strong protagonist and good role model. In an interview with Asiance magazine, Song described how she identified with the character struggling to keep her heritage.Wendy Wu: Homecoming Warrior Review. RevolutionSF.com. Accessed 2007-08-08. While commending Disney for the strong Asian cast, a BellaOnline review noted that it is rare to see a female martial arts star with a black belt.

 Production 

 Filming locations 
The movie was filmed in Auckland, New Zealand to accommodate action unit director Koichi Sakamoto, who also choreographed Power Rangers in Auckland. However, some scenes were filmed in Disney Studios, United States. It took 24 days to shoot the movie in New Zealand according to Brenda Song. The cast then promoted the movie and the trailer to Disney Channel fans. Disney promoted the movie in various countries including Malaysia, Japan and Australia. Although the movie was set in California, it was shot on location in New Zealand, with parts of it shot at Long Bay College, a high school in Auckland. Many drama students from Long Bay College were used as extras, and they can be seen chiefly in the school scenes.

Casting
The film was shot on a budget of $5 million. Song trained for more than 2 weeks, 16 hours each day. Although Song had stunt doubles for some scenes, she did most of her own stunt work for the film with guidance from Koichi Sakamoto, executive producer for the Power Rangers franchise. Song was inspired to endure the stunt training by the way her mother dealt with breast cancer in 2005.

Several actors from this movie had previously appeared in the Power Rangers series. Sally Martin and Anna Hutchison both portrayed actual Rangers: Martin was the Blue Ranger (also named Tori Hanson) in 2003's Ninja Storm, and Hutchison was the Yellow Ranger in 2008's Jungle Fury. Additional actors in this film that appeared in Power Rangers include James Gaylyn (Ninja Storm, Dino Thunder, S.P.D, Operation Overdrive, and RPM), Geoff Dolan (Mystic Force, Samurai, and Megaforce), Sally Stockwell (Mystic Force), and Shin Koyamada (Wild Force).

This film contains so many martial arts sequences that Disney had to rate it TV-PG. Wendy Wu: Homecoming Warrior is the eighth DCOM to receive a TV-PG rating; before it were Tiger Cruise, Don't Look Under the Bed, Halloweentown, Halloweentown II: Kalabar's Revenge, Jett Jackson: The Movie, Mom's Got A Date With A Vampire, and Twitches.

Song commuted during film breaks to film the second season of The Suite Life of Zack & Cody.

 Setting 
The movie takes place in the fictional city of Fair Springs, California. According to a local weather report that Wendy sees on TV, Fair Springs is located around the actual city of Modesto, California. The evil spirit Yan Lo is named after Yamarāja, the lord of death in Buddhist and Hindu philosophy. The name Yan Lo is a shortened Chinese transliteration of Yamarāja's name.

 Home media Wendy Wu: Homecoming Warrior was released on DVD on October 24, 2006.

It is the third DCOM on DVD to be certified Platinum in DVD sales; the first is The Cheetah Girls. The Wendy Wu: Homecoming Warrior sold more than 13,933 in DVD on amazon.com making the DVD the #14 most popular Kids DVD ever sold on Amazon.com. Despite being filmed in the 16:9 aspect ratio, the original and Kickin Edition DVD releases featured a 4:3 "full screen" version (though not pan and scan as the camera stays directly in the center of the image), the format of the film as shown on the Disney Channel.

 Soundtrack 
 Go (Jump! Mix)" Performed by Jupiter Rising
 "Will it Go 'Round in Circles? Performed by Orlando Brown
 "Dance Alone" Performed by Sweet James
 "Keepin It" Performed by Drew Seeley

 Awards Wendy Wu: Homecoming Warrior won the "Best TV Movie" award at the Nickelodeon Australian Kids' Choice Awards 2006. It also won the Golden Icon Award for "Outstanding Cast Ensemble", the award was presented by The Travolta Family Entertainment. The movie also won the "Best Asian American Cast Ensemble" at the "San Francisco International Asian American Film Festival". The movie was voted number 1 by Asiance magazine for favorite teen movie of the year.

 Merchandise 

 Clothing and dolls 
In 2006, Claire's and Disney released necklaces and hairbrushes on the face of Wendy Wu and Shen. They later released a full line of accessories. Postcards and coloring books were also released. Brenda Song and Shin Koyamada got the opportunity to design some items in the line. A calendar for the movie was released in 2006 and 2007.

Asian toy distributors teamed with Disney to release a line of Wendy Wu: Homecoming Warrior dolls exclusively released only in Malaysia, Japan and South America.

Most of the merchandise lines are mainly available in Asian retailers in Asia though some postcards and coloring booklets are available in the United States and in Europe. The merchandise depended on the film's popularity in states. A video game was also released in various countries.

In Japan, Bandai (The movie's sponsor in Japan) made Wendy Wu: Homecoming Warrior toys, with a Gashapon series released on the day of the DCOM's release.

 Legacy 
In Malaysia, TV3 created a small parody of the movie, the plot was the same though the channel joked about the monsters and villains in the movie.

MADtv had a small parody about Wendy Wu and Shen losing their virginity and having to lose their supernatural powers and Yan Low attends to reappear in the scene battling Wendy and Shen.

Also TV ONE in New Zealand launched a reality show for the Next Homecoming Queen which has some references to the movie and to the cast. In a Halloween-themed episode of The View, Barbara Walters referenced to Yan Low and Wendy Wu.

In Costa Rica, Disney created a search for Wendy Wu and Shen for a small stage production airing on Disney Channel. The production did not include stunt doubles or moves since the actors were not trained that professionally.

Song and Koyamada attended the Walt Disney World Christmas Day Parade in Disneyland as Wendy Wu and Shen doing a small sketch and battle scene. Song was one of the co-hosts in the parade before her appearance. The April 13, 2008 comic of comic series, Marvin featured Brenda Song in kid form promoting a fictional Dizney Preshcool Karate.

Cancelled sequel
In October 2007, Variety reported a sequel to Wendy Wu: Homecoming Warrior. It was hinted in the DVD's alternate ending where Yan-Lo is revealed to be possessing the Wu family's dog, unbeknownst to everyone else. Filming would have been shot in early 2008, but the sequel was eventually cut from the schedule, and no further announcements have been made. The sequel to Wendy Wu: Homecoming Warrior'' has since been cancelled.

References

External links 

 
 
 
 

2006 films
2006 comedy films
2006 television films
2000s children's comedy films
2000s children's fantasy films
2000s fantasy comedy films
2000s teen comedy films
American children's comedy films
American children's fantasy films
American comedy television films
American fantasy comedy films
American teen comedy films
Films about Chinese Americans
Disney Channel Original Movie films
Fantasy television films
Films scored by Nathan Wang
Films set in California
Films shot in Los Angeles County, California
Films shot in New Zealand
Kung fu films
Films directed by John Laing
2000s American films